The island mackerel (Rastrelliger faughni) is a species of true mackerel in the scombrid family (Scombridae) from the Indo-Pacific. Their maximum reported length is 20 cm, and the maximum reported weight is 0.75 kg.

While the FAO report no commercial landings of island mackerel, the IUCN report annual landings in excess of 800,000 tonnes.

References

Rastrelliger
Scombridae
Fish described in 1967